The Gaskiers Formation is a geologic formation in Newfoundland and Labrador. It preserves fossils dating back to the Ediacaran period.

See also

 List of fossiliferous stratigraphic units in Newfoundland and Labrador

References
 

Ediacaran Newfoundland and Labrador